Landmarks officially designated by local city or county governments in the United States.

Alabama

Alaska

Arizona

Arkansas

California

 California Historical Landmarks in Yolo County, California
 National Register of Historic Places listings in Yolo County, California
 List of Berkeley Landmarks, Structures of Merit, and Historic Districts
 List of City of Long Beach historic landmarks
Los Angeles Historic-Cultural Monuments
List of Los Angeles Historic-Cultural Monuments in Downtown Los Angeles
List of Los Angeles Historic-Cultural Monuments on the East and Northeast Sides
List of Los Angeles Historic-Cultural Monuments in the Harbor area
List of Los Angeles Historic-Cultural Monuments in Hollywood
List of Los Angeles Historic-Cultural Monuments in the San Fernando Valley
List of Los Angeles Historic-Cultural Monuments in Silver Lake, Angelino Heights, and Echo Park
List of Los Angeles Historic-Cultural Monuments in South Los Angeles
List of Los Angeles Historic-Cultural Monuments on the Westside
List of Los Angeles Historic-Cultural Monuments in the Wilshire and Westlake areas
 List of Oakland Designated Landmarks
 List of landmarks in Riverside, California
 List of San Francisco Designated Landmarks
 List of San Diego Historic Landmarks
 List of San Diego Historical Landmarks in La Jolla
 List of San Diego Historic Landmarks in the Point Loma and Ocean Beach areas
 List of City of Santa Monica Designated Historic Landmarks

Colorado

Connecticut

Delaware

Florida

Georgia

Hawaii

Idaho

Illinois
 List of Chicago Landmarks

Indiana

Iowa

Kansas

Kentucky

Louisiana

Maine

Maryland

Massachusetts

Michigan
List of Michigan State Historic Sites
Category: Lists of Michigan State Historic Sites by county

Minnesota

Mississippi

Missouri
 Landmarks of St. Louis

Montana

Nebraska
 List of Omaha landmarks

Nevada

New Hampshire

New Jersey

New Mexico
 List of historic landmarks in Albuquerque

New York
 List of New York City Landmarks
 List of Town of Oyster Bay Landmarks

North Carolina

North Dakota

Ohio

Oklahoma

Oregon

Pennsylvania
 List of City of Pittsburgh historic designations

Rhode Island

South Carolina

South Dakota

Tennessee

Texas
 List of Dallas Landmarks

Utah

Vermont

Virginia

Washington
 List of landmarks in King County, Washington
 List of Seattle landmarks

West Virginia

Wisconsin

Wyoming

Commonwealths and territories

See also
Federal designations
 National Natural Landmark
 National Register of Historic Places
 National Historic Landmarks
 National Historic Sites
 National Military Parks
 National Memorials
 National Monuments

State Registries
 California Historical Landmarks
 List of Mississippi Landmarks



 
Landmarks